Buried in Time is a Nancy Drew and Hardy Boys Supermystery crossover novel.

George Fayne and Nancy Drew go to Oklahoma, where Jim Haber introduces them to Carson Drew's old friend Dr. Langford, who is in crisis. Langford heads an archaeological dig, but strange things are happening at the site. There are cave-ins and thefts in the vaults of the Red Clay artifacts. There, Nancy spots Frank and Joe Hardy, and after lunching together, Nancy finds out that they are there on the case of missing truck shipments that contained uranium and heavy water – materials used to make an atom bomb.

The next morning, a cave-in has supposedly killed Dr. Langford in a vault. As the interrogations go on, a Comanche woman named Red Sky Winsea and her grandfather John Whiteshirt talk about warning Langford that the "spirits" at the Red Clay gravesites were out to avenge their disturbances. The two become prime suspects in the murder after George finds a note with the same warning on it in Langford's office. With Langford now gone, Dr. Ottman heads the dig. Nancy and George discover that right before this major site was found by Ottman, he came down with food poisoning and all the credit for the discovery was given to Langford. Some diggers hint that Ottman was probably mad at Langford for stealing his thunder.

Meanwhile, Frank and Joe Hardy get barked at by Captain Van Allen Lorimor at the Jackson Air Force Base when they reveal that they are the "Network fellas" and gives them the records of the missing shipments, which was really no help. Back at the site, Nancy and George have to tell Lieutenant Deerhunter that they were on a stakeout the night before to see if they could catch the vault thief red-handed. The police are all buddy-buddy with Nancy now, but both cases seem to be going nowhere, until they get a jump start where they realize that both cases may be intertwined after all.

References

External links
Supermystery series books

Supermystery
1990 American novels
1990 children's books
Novels set in Oklahoma